Dadang Wigiarto (Pasuruan, 20 December 1966 – Situbondo, 26 November 2020) was an Indonesian politician, member of the National Awakening Party.

Biography
He served as Regent of Situbondo from 2010 until his death in office in 2020.

He served as Chairman of the Ulema National Awakening Party in the Situbondo Regional People's Representative Council.

He was elected as Regent of Situbondo in 2010 and re-elected in the 2015 Indonesian local elections. During his tenure, Situbondo Regency won the Adipura trophy (awarded to cities in Indonesia that are successful in cleaning and managing the urban environment) three times; additionally, he proclaimed a car free day on Sundays on the main road in Situbondo City. His order to civil servants to hold Dhuhur prayers in congregation raised controversy.

During the COVID-19 pandemic in Indonesia, Dadang was hospitalized in Situbondo for COVID and died on 26 November 2020, at age 53.

References

1966 births
2020 deaths
National Awakening Party politicians
People from Pasuruan
Javanese people
Deaths from the COVID-19 pandemic in Indonesia
Politicians from East Java